The Best, The Rest, The Rare is a compilation album by the German power/speed metal band Helloween. It was released in 1991 on the label Noise Records.

Track listing

Personnel
Michael Kiske - vocals
Kai Hansen - guitars; vocals on "Ride the Sky" and "Judas"
Michael Weikath - guitars
Markus Grosskopf - bass guitar
Ingo Schwichtenberg - drums
Alasdair Lincoln - tambourine

Reception
The album received praise from Encyclopaedia Metallum who called it "A great compilation", despite the fact that the album didn't include songs "Phantoms of Death" and "Eagle Fly Free".

Charts

References

External links
Official artist website
Official record label website

Helloween compilation albums
1991 compilation albums